

Science
Inia, genus of river dolphins

Geography
Inia, Paphos, village in Cyprus

Other uses
Ibrahim Nasir International Airport, former name of the Velana International Airport in the Maldives